Jean-Bédel Bokassa Jr. (born 2 November 1973) is a son of Jean-Bédel Bokassa, the former dictator of the Central African Republic and its successor state, the Central African Empire, by his sixth wife, Catherine Denguiadé.

Following his father's decision to become Emperor of Central Africa, Jean-Bédel Bokassa Jr. was named, at the age of 4, heir apparent with the title of crown prince (prince héritier de Centrafrique). He was chosen despite having several older brothers and half-brothers. Bokassa I's eldest son by another wife, Georges, was a cabinet minister but Bokassa considered him weak.

Jean-Bédel Bokassa Jr. was included in his father's lavish coronation of 4 December 1977.

He is currently a socialite living in Paris.

Honours 
  Knight Grand Cross of the Order of Central African Merit (4 December 1977).

References

External links
 Time magazine's report of the coronation 

1973 births
Mbaka people
Living people
Pretenders
Central African royalty
Heirs apparent who never acceded
House of Bokassa